Zeuroepkia is a genus of moths in the family Cossidae. It contains only one species, Zeuroepkia borneana, which is found on Borneo. Its habitat consists of alluvial forests, lowland limestone forests and upper montane forests.

There are broad black striae on the forewings. The black markings become more intense at the margins. The hindwings have several marginal black spots.

References

Natural History Museum Lepidoptera generic names catalog

Zeuzerinae
Monotypic moth genera